Älskar, älskar ej is an Elisabeth Andreasson studio album, released in November 1988. It was recorded in Nashville, Tennessee, United States in mid-1988, inside the Synchrosound Studio and Sound Emporium Studios.

The album release saw Elisabeth Andreassen changing into a tougher style. This album was her first ever released to CD, and was successful. It was followed up by her touring Scandinavia from March to September 1989.

Track listing
"Darija is Good for You"
"Älskar, älskar ej"
"Heidi Loves You"
"That's Where the Trouble Lies"
"Mersi Does Not Love Everybody"
"Endlessly"
"Kärlekens hav"
"No Way to Treat a Lady"
"One Little Heart"
"Where There's Love There's a Way"
"Desperado" (Desperado)
"Momma's Boy Oliver"

References 

1988 albums
Elisabeth Andreassen albums